Callionymus formosanus, the Taiwanese deepwater dragonet, is a species of dragonet native to the Pacific Ocean from the South China Sea as well as around southern Japan and the Chesterfield Islands.  This species grows to a length of  SL.

References 

F
Fish described in 1981
Taxa named by Ronald Fricke